Simple Login Manager (SLiM) is a graphical display manager for the X Window System that can be run independently of any window manager or desktop environment. SLiM aims to be light, completely configurable, and suitable for machines on which remote login functionalities are not needed.

SLiM was forked from Per Lidén's Login.app program, with contributions from Martin Parm for PAM-related classes. SLiM is currently developed by Simone Rota and Johannes Winkelmann, and is currently maintained by Nobuhiro Iwamatsu.

As of March, 2016, SLiM seems to be abandoned. It is not fully compatible with systemd.

As of September, 2016, GhostBSD 10.3 replaced GDM with SLiM.

Features 
SLiM supports the following features:
 PNG and XFT support for alpha transparency and anti-aliased fonts
 External themes support
 Configurable runtime options: X server, login / shutdown / reboot commands
 Single (GDM-like) or double (XDM-like) input control
 Can load predefined user at startup
 Configurable welcome / shutdown messages
 Random theme selection

Dependencies 
SLiM has the following dependencies:

 X11
 libpng
 libjpeg
 freetype

See also 
 LightDM, the formerly Ubuntu’s default display manager, now GDM
 SDDM, the KDE Plasma 5 display manager
 KDM, the KDE Plasma 4 display manager
 GDM, the GNOME display manager
 Other display managers

References

External links 
 SLiM at GitHub
 

X display managers